Deudorix vansomereni, the Van Someren's playboy, is a butterfly in the family Lycaenidae. It is found in south-eastern Kenya and north-eastern Tanzania. The habitat consists of forests.

The larvae feed on Acacia species and Agalana obliqua.

References

Butterflies described in 1951
Deudorigini
Deudorix